The Directorate-General for Agriculture, Fisheries, Social Affairs and Health is a directorate-general of the Council of the European Union that prepares the work and tasks of the Agriculture and Fisheries Council.

See also 
 Special Committee on Agriculture
 Committee of Permanent Representatives
 European Parliament Committee on Agriculture and Rural Development
 European Parliament Committee on Fisheries
 European Commissioner for Agriculture and Rural Development
 Directorate-General for Agriculture and Rural Development
 European Commissioner for Maritime Affairs and Fisheries
 Directorate-General for Maritime Affairs and Fisheries
 Community Plant Variety Office
 European Food Safety Authority
 European Fisheries Control Agency

External links 
 Agriculture and Fisheries

Council of the European Union